Rock You to Hell is the third studio album by the British heavy metal band Grim Reaper, released in 1987 under the RCA label. This was the band's final album for 29 years (until the release of Walking in the Shadows in 2016, under the name Steve Grimmett's Grim Reaper), and their last one to feature guitarist Nick Bowcott, bassist Dave Wanklin and drummer Marc Simon. Grim Reaper gained brief mainstream critical and commercial success with this album, due to the regular airplay of "Rock You to Hell" on MTV's Headbangers Ball and album-oriented rock radio stations.

Track listing

Personnel
Grim Reaper
Steve Grimmett – vocals
Nick Bowcott – guitar, backing vocals, arrangements
Dave Wanklin – bass
Marc Simon – drums, backing vocals

Additional personal
Nibby Gibson – backing vocals
Deke Kenderian – backing vocals

Production
mixed at Atlantic Studios, New York City
Max Norman – producer, engineer, mixing, arrangements, backing vocals
Kerry Roher, Jesse Anderson, Claude Achille, Ellen Fitton – assistant engineers
Concrete Management – management 
Bob Chiappardi – management 
Walter O'Brien – management
Wendy Goldstein – A&R, management
Garry Sharpe – cover artwork

References

1987 albums
Grim Reaper (band) albums
RCA Records albums
Albums produced by Max Norman